Leonel Saúl Pérez Quintero (born 1 July 1994 in Acapulco, Guerrero) is a Mexican professional footballer who last played for Tuxtla.

External links
 
 

Living people
1994 births
Mexican footballers
Association football defenders
Club Tijuana footballers
Dorados de Sinaloa footballers
Tuxtla F.C. footballers
Ascenso MX players
Liga Premier de México players
Footballers from Guerrero
Sportspeople from Acapulco